Capuchino High School is a public high school in San Bruno, California, United States. It is one of seven high schools in the San Mateo Union High School District, a division of the San Mateo County Office of Education.

Capuchino's rival is Mills High School in Millbrae.

History

The school opened in September 1950. There was initially only one two-story building on the campus; by 1953 most of the campus was completed. A 1,000-seat auditorium was built in 1959, supplementing the school's little theatre. In the 1961–62 academic year, just prior to the completion of Crestmoor High School, student enrollment exceeded 1,800 and almost every available space was utilized for classrooms.

In 1963, KPIX (Channel 5) filmed scenes, including a pep rally, at the school for its weekly High School Salute program.  Host Dick Stewart  also interviewed students and faculty in the KPIX studios during the telecast.

In 1976, student Paula Baxter went missing after leaving the high school following a play rehearsal. Her body, which had been stabbed and sexually assaulted, was found two days later behind a church in Millbrae.

SMUHSD residents approved Measure D in November 2000, which authorized funding for school renovation and modernization. Capuchino has a renovated science wing, a new spirit court and cafeteria building, and several new classrooms adjoining the new administration building.

Measure M funds were approved by SMUHSD voters in 2006 which in part funded the construction of a new humanities, arts, and sciences building (HASB) and theater remodel. In April 2012 the new HASB was completed and students moved in to finish their school year.

Sports
Capuchino has long had an outstanding athletic department.  It initially competed in the Peninsula Athletic League, which stretched from Jefferson High School in Daly City to Lincoln High School in San Jose.  As more high schools were built during the 1950s and early 1960s, the Mid-Peninsula was established to include the seven high schools of the San Mateo Union High School District.  Capuchino dominated league competition over the years, especially in football, basketball, swimming, wrestling, track, and tennis.  During the late 1950s the school won the league championships in varsity football, basketball, and baseball, a time often referred to as "The Golden Age of Sports." Capuchino baseball players Wally Bunker and Keith Hernandez both went on to careers in Major League Baseball.

In the 1990s, Capuchino's girls' softball team won five consecutive Central Coast Section (CCS) Championships (1993–1997), and was state ranked on three occasions during this period.  Capuchino also has a 32-9 Central Coast Section Playoff record, giving it the second best winning percentage of all schools in the section.

Statistics

Demographics
2017-2018
 1,213 students: 626 male (51.6%), 587 female (48.4%)  

Approximately 35.6% of the students at Capuchino are served by the free or reduced-price lunch program.

Standardized testing

Notable alumni

Alumni

 Steve Oppermann, 1958, former PGA Tour professional
 Luana De Vol, 1960, opera singer
 Bill Neukom, 1960, Managing General Partner of the San Francisco Giants
 Billee Patricia Daniels, 1961, former Olympian

 Wally Bunker, 1963, former MLB player
Suzanne Somers, 1964, actress
 Neal Dahlen, former Denver Broncos general manager
 Keith Hernandez, 1971, former MLB player
 Darrell Steinberg, 1977, politician

Faculty
Leo Ryan, history teacher and politician, 1961

See also

San Mateo County high schools

References

External links
 Official site of Capuchino High School
 Official site of Capuchino High School sports programs
 Capuchino High School alumni association
 California Department of Education reports for Capuchino High School
 U.S. News & World Report ranking

Educational institutions established in 1950
High schools in San Mateo County, California
International Baccalaureate schools in California
San Bruno, California
Public high schools in California
1950 establishments in California